Daniel Barrett is an animation supervisor.

On January 24, 2012, he was nominated for an Academy Award for Best Visual Effects for the film Rise of the Planet of the Apes.

Barrett received his second Oscar nomination for the sequel Dawn of the Planet of the Apes at the 87th Academy Awards, and his third for War for the Planet of the Apes at the 90th Academy Awards.

On March 12, 2023, Barrett won his first Academy Award for Best Visual Effects for Avatar: The Way of Water.

References

External links

Visual effects supervisors
Living people
Year of birth missing (living people)
Place of birth missing (living people)
Annie Award winners
Best Visual Effects BAFTA Award winners
Best Visual Effects Academy Award winners